Johann Sebastian Bach's vocal music includes cantatas, motets, masses, Magnificats, Passions, oratorios, four-part chorales, songs and arias. His instrumental music includes concertos, suites, sonatas, fugues, and other works for organ, harpsichord, lute, violin, viola da gamba, cello, flute, chamber ensemble and orchestra.

There are over 1000 known compositions by Bach.

Listing Bach's compositions
Some of the early biographies of Johann Sebastian Bach contain lists of his compositions. For instance, his obituary contains a list of the instrumental compositions printed during the composer's lifetime, followed by an approximate list of his unpublished work. The first separately published biography of the composer, by Johann Nikolaus Forkel, follows the same approach: its ninth chapter first lists printed works (adding four-part chorales which had been published in the second half of the 18th century), followed by a rough overview of the unpublished ones. In the first half of the 19th century more works were published, so the next biographies (Schauer and Hilgenfeldt in 1850) had more elaborate appendices listing printed works, referring to these works by publisher, and the number or page number given to the works in these publications. So, for example, the Prelude and Fugue in E-flat major can be indicated as "C. F. Peters Vol. III No. 1", or any of the variants ("Griepenkerl and Roitzsch Vol. 3 p. 2", "Peters Book 242 p. 2", "P. S. V., Cah. 3 (242), No. 1", etc.)

BG

In the second half of the 19th century the Bach-Gesellschaft (BG) published all of Bach's works in around 50 volumes, the so-called Bach Gesellschaft Ausgabe (BGA). This offered a unique identification of all of Bach's known works, a system that was quickly adopted, for instance by the biographers: Philipp Spitta used it complementarily to the Peters edition numbering for the BG volumes that had appeared when he was writing his Bach-biography in the second half of the 19th century (e.g. "B. G., III., p. 173" for the above-mentioned Prelude in E-flat major), and Terry used it in the third Appendix to his 20th-century translation of Forkel's biography.

But there was still a lot of confusion: some authors preferred to list Bach's works according to Novello's editions, or Augener's, or Schirmer's,... giving rise to various conversion tables at the end of books on Bach's compositions (e.g. Harvey Grace's in a 1922 book on Bach's organ compositions).

NBG
In 1900 the BG published its last volume, and dissolved itself, as its primary goal, publishing all of Bach's known works, was accomplished. The BG was succeeded by the Neue Bachgesellschaft (NBG), with a new set of goals (Bach yearbook, Bach festivals, and a Bach museum). Occasionally however the NBG published newly discovered works, or variants not published in the BGA. For instance the 1740s version of O Jesu Christ, meins Lebens Licht was published in NBG XVII1 in 1916 (the 1730s version of the same piece, with a different orchestration, had been published in BG 24, pp. 185–192).

BWV

In 1950 the Bach-Werke-Verzeichnis was published, allocating a unique number to every known composition by Bach. Wolfgang Schmieder, the editor of that catalogue, grouped the compositions by genre, largely following BG for the collation (e.g. BG cantata number = BWV number of the cantata):

 Kantaten (Cantatas), BWV 1–224
 Motetten (Motets), BWV 225–231
 Messen, Messensätze, Magnificat (Masses, Mass movements, Magnificat), BWV 232–243
 Passionen, Oratorien (Passions, Oratorios), BWV 244–249
 Vierstimmige Choräle (Four-part chorales), BWV 250–438
 Lieder, Arien, Quodlibet (Songs, Arias and Quodlibet), BWV 439–524
 Werke für Orgel (Works for organ), BWV 525–771
 Werke für Klavier (Keyboard compositions), BWV 772–994
 Werke für Laute (Lute compositions), BWV 995–1000
 Kammermusik (Chamber music), BWV 1001–1040
 Orchesterwerke (Works for orchestra), BWV 1041–1071, originally in two separate chapters: Concertos (BWV 1041–1065) and Overtures (BWV 1066–1071)
 Kanons (Canons), BWV 1072–1078
 Musikalisches Opfer, Kunst der Fuge (Musical Offering, Art of the Fugue), BWV 1079–1080

For instance, the Prelude and Fugue in E-flat major now became BWV 552, situated in the range of the works for organ. In contrast to other catalogues such as the Köchel catalogue for Mozart's compositions there is no attempt at chronological organization in the BWV numbering, for instance BWV 992 is an early composition by Bach. Exceptionally BWV numbers are also indicated as Schmieder (S) numbers (e.g. S. 225 = BWV 225).

Another consequence of the ordering principles of the BWV was that it tore known collections apart, for instance Clavier-Übung III was partly in the organ compositions range (BWV 552 and 669–689), with the four duets listed among the keyboard compositions (BWV 802–805).

BWV Anh.
The Anhang (Anh.), i.e. Appendix, of the BWV listed works that were not suitable for the main catalogue, in three sections:
 I – lost works, or works of which only a tiny fraction had survived (Anh. 1–23)
 II – works of dubious authenticity (Anh. 24–155)
 III – works that were once attributed to Bach, but for which it had been established they were not composed by him (Anh. 156–189)
Within each section of the Anhang the works are sorted by genre, following the same sequence of genres as the main catalogue.

Schmieder published the BWV's second edition in 1990, with some modifications regarding authenticity discriminations, and more works added to the main catalogue and the Anhang. A strict numerical collation was abandoned to insert additions, or when for another reason compositions were regrouped. For example, BWV 11, formerly listed as a Cantata, was moved to the fourth chapter of the main catalogue as an Oratorio. Rather than renumbering a composition, an arrow indicated where the composition was inserted: "" meaning "BWV 11, inserted after BWV 249b" (4th chapter). Similarly,  meant BWV 1083, inserted after BWV 243a (3rd chapter). Also authenticity discriminations, based on new research, could lead to such repositionings within the catalogue, e.g. "" became " indicating it was now considered a spurious work.

In 1998 Alfred Dürr and Yoshitake Kobayashi published a small edition of the catalogue, based on the 1990 second edition. This edition, known as BWV2a, contained a few further updates and collation rearrangements.

New additions (Nachträge) to BWV2/BWV2a included:
 BWV 1081–1126
 BWV Anh. 190–213

A few exceptions to the principle that compositions were not renumbered were when a composition from the Anhang could be recovered or authenticated as Bach's, so that it deserved a place in the main catalogue, in which case it was given a number above 1080. So, for example, BWV Anh. 205 (BWV2) → BWV 1121 (BWV2a, where it is in section 7 as a work for organ).

Other renumberings and additional numbers involved alternative or earlier versions of basically the same composition, which were indicated by adding a lower case letter to the BWV number. Examples:
 BWV 243a: 1723 E major version of the 1733 Magnificat in D major BWV 243
 BWV 1071 renumbered to BWV 1046a (early version of the first Brandenburg Concerto)
 BWV Anh. 198 renumbered to BWV 149/1a (earlier abandoned version of the opening movement of Cantata BWV 149)

Some versions were completely removed from the catalogue, e.g. BWV 655b and c.

Slashes indicate movements: e.g. BWV 149/1 indicates the first movement of the Cantata BWV 149. Another example: the Agnus Dei of the Mass in B minor can be indicated as BWV 232/22 (22nd movement of the composition), or alternatively as BWV 232IV/4 (BWV 232, fourth movement of Part IV).

21st-century additions
Numbers above BWV 1126 were added in the 21st century.

Reconstructed versions
An upper case R added to a BWV number indicates a reconstructed version, that is a conjectured earlier version of a known composition. One of such reconstructions, the Concerto for oboe and violin, as published in NBA VII/7 (Supplement) p. 75, based on the double harpsichord concerto BWV 1060, is known as BWV 1060R.

BWV3
As of mid-2018 the Bach digital website started to implement the new numbers of the 3rd edition of the Bach-Werke-Verzeichnis, which has been announced for publication in 2020. For example, the Leipzig version of the Christ lag in Todes Banden cantata used to be BWV 4 in previous versions of the catalogue, and, in BWV3, has become BWV 4.2.

NBA

In the meantime, the New Bach Edition (Neue Bach-Ausgabe, abbreviated as NBA) was being published, offering a new system to refer to Bach's works, e.g. , which is Series IV, Volume 4, p. 2 (Prelude) and p. 105 (Fugue), for BWV 552.

NBArev

Some years after the completion of the NBA in 2007 its publisher Bärenreiter joined with the Bach Archive again to publish revised editions of some of Bach's scores. These revised editions, aligning with the NBA editions (format, layout), but outside that group of publications, were published under the name Johann Sebastian Bach: New Edition of the Complete Works – Revised Edition (Johann Sebastian Bach: Neue Ausgabe sämtlicher Werke – Revidierte Edition), in short: New Bach Edition – Revised (Neue Bach-Ausgabe – Revidierte Edition), abbreviated as NBArev. Where the original NBA editions were exclusively in German, the volumes of the Revised series have their introductions both in German and English. Its first volume, NBArev 1, was a new edition of the Mass in B minor, appearing in 2010.

BC
The Bach Compendium (BC), a catalogue covering Bach's vocal works was published in 1985. Occasionally works that have no BWV number can be identified by their BC number, e.g. BC C 8 for "Der Gerechte kömmt um" an arrangement attributed to Bach on stylistic grounds, however unmentioned in the BWV.

BNB
Bachs Notenbibliothek (BNB) is a list of works Bach had at his disposition. Works of other composers which were arranged by Bach or which he (had) copied for performance usually have a BNB number.

SBB
The Berlin State Library (Staatsbibliothek zu Berlin = SBB) holds an important collection of composition manuscripts relating to Bach. Some versions of works are best known by their principal manuscript in the SBB, for instance  = , or according to the abbreviations used at the Bach-digital website .

By opus number, and chronological lists

Apart from indicating his first published keyboard composition as Opus 1, Bach did not use opus numbers. Lists following publication chronologies are for example implied in the first list in Bach's obituary, and BG numbers (within the BGA sequence of publication) – overall lists covering all of Bach's compositions in order of first publication are however not a way Bach's compositions are usually presented.

Listing Bach's works according to their time of composition cannot be done comprehensively: for many works the period in which they were composed is a very wide range. For Bach's larger vocal works (cantatas, Passions,...) research has led to some more or less generally accepted chronologies, covering most of these works: a catalogue in this sense is Philippe (and Gérard) Zwang's list giving a chronological number to the cantatas BWV 1–215 and 248–249. This list was published in 1982 as Guide pratique des cantates de Bach in Paris, . A revised edition was published in 2005.

Other composers

Various catalogues with works by other composers have intersections with collections of works associated with Bach:
BR-WFB (or) BR  Bach-Repertorium numbers for works by Wilhelm Friedemann Bach, e.g. BWV 970 = BR A49
Other BRs:
BR-CPEB: works by Carl Philipp Emanuel Bach (for this composer Helm or Wotquenne numbers are however more often used)
BR-JCFB: works by Johann Christoph Friedrich Bach
Fk (or) F  Falck catalogue numbers for works by Wilhelm Friedemann Bach, e.g. BWV 970 = F 25/2
H  Helm numbers for works by Carl Philipp Emanuel Bach, e.g. BWV 1036 = H 569
HWV  Works by George Frideric Handel, e.g. BWV Anh. 106 = HWV 605
TWV  Compositions by Georg Philipp Telemann, e.g. BWV 824 = TWV 32:14
Warb (or) W  Warburton numbers for works by Johann Christian Bach, e.g.  = W A22
Wq  Wotquenne numbers for works by Carl Philipp Emanuel Bach, e.g. BWV 1036 = Wq 145

Works in Bach's catalogues and collections
There are over 1500 works that feature in a catalogue of works by Bach, like the Bach-Werke-Verzeichnis, and/or in a collection of works associated with Bach (e.g. in one of the Notebooks for Anna Magdalena Bach). Of these around a thousand are original compositions by Bach, that is: more than a mere copy or transcription of an earlier work by himself or another composer.

|- id="BWV Chapter 1" style="background: #D8D8D8;"
| data-sort-value="0000.z99" | 1.
| data-sort-value="001.001" colspan="8" | Cantatas (see also: List of Bach cantatas, Church cantata (Bach) and List of secular cantatas by Johann Sebastian Bach)
| data-sort-value="0000a" | Up ↑

|- id="BWV Chapter 2" style="background: #D8D8D8;"
| data-sort-value="0224.z99" | 2.
| data-sort-value="228.001" colspan="8" | Motets (see also: List of motets by Johann Sebastian Bach)
| data-sort-value="0281a" | Up ↑

|- id="BWV Chapter 5" style="background: #D8D8D8;"
| data-sort-value="0249.z99" | 5.
| data-sort-value="284.001" colspan="8" | Four-part chorales (see also: List of chorale harmonisations by Johann Sebastian Bach)
| data-sort-value="0319a" | Up ↑
|- id="Three wedding chorales" style="background: #E3F6CE;"
| data-sort-value="0250.000" | 250
| data-sort-value="284.002" | 5.
| data-sort-value="1736-07-01" | 1734–1738
| chorale setting "Was Gott tut, das ist wohlgetan" (Three wedding chorales No. 1)
|
| data-sort-value="SATB Hnx2 Ob Oba Str Bc" | SATB 2Hn Ob Oba Str Bc
| data-sort-value="000.13 1: 147" | 131: 147
| data-sort-value="III/02 1: 000a" | III/2.1: 3
| text by Rodigast
| 
|- style="background: #E3F6CE;"
| data-sort-value="0251.000" | 251
| data-sort-value="284.003" | 5.
| data-sort-value="1736-07-01" | 1734–1738
| chorale setting "Sei Lob und Ehr dem höchsten Gut" (Three wedding chorales No. 2)
|
| data-sort-value="SATB Hnx2 Ob Oba Str Bc" | SATB 2Hn Ob Oba Str Bc
| data-sort-value="000.13 1: 148" | 131: 148
| data-sort-value="III/02 1: 000b" | III/2.1: 4
| text by Schütz, J. J.
| 
|- style="background: #E3F6CE;"
| data-sort-value="0252.000" | 252
| data-sort-value="284.004" | 5.
| data-sort-value="1736-07-01" | 1734–1738
| chorale setting "Nun danket alle Gott" (Three wedding chorales No. 3)
|
| data-sort-value="SATB Hnx2 Ob Oba Str Bc" | SATB 2Hn Ob Oba Str Bc
| data-sort-value="000.13 1: 149" | 131: 149
| data-sort-value="III/02 1: 000c" | III/2.1: 5
| text by Rinkart
| 

|- style="background: #E3F6CE;"
| data-sort-value="0500.a00" | 500a
| data-sort-value="302.003" | 5.
| 1726-04-19
| chorale setting "So gehst du nun, mein Jesu, hin" (in Bach's Leipzig versions of St Mark Passion attributed to Keiser)
|
| SATB Str Bc
|
| data-sort-value="II/09: 075" | II/9: 75
| 
|- style="background: #E3F6CE;"
| data-sort-value="1084.000" | 1084
| data-sort-value="302.004" | 5.
| 1726-04-19
| chorale setting "O hilf Christe, Gottes Sohn" (in Bach's Leipzig versions of St Mark Passion attributed to Keiser)
|
| SATB Str Bc
|
| data-sort-value="II/09: 076" | II/9: 76
| text by Weiße; after BC D 5a/14
| 
|-
| data-sort-value="1089.000" | 1089
| data-sort-value="302.006" | 5.
|
| chorale setting "Da Jesus an dem Kreuze stund"
|
| SATB
|
| data-sort-value="III/02 2: 216" | III/2.2: 216
| text by 
| 
|- style="background: #F6E3CE;"
| data-sort-value="1122.000" | 1122
| data-sort-value="303.003" | 5.
| data-sort-value="1730-01-01" |  or earlier
| chorale setting "Denket doch, ihr Menschenkinder"
| F maj.
| SATB
|
| data-sort-value="III/02 1: 038" | III/2.1: 31III/2.2: 217
| text by Hübner?
| 
|- style="background: #F6E3CE;"
| data-sort-value="1123.000" | 1123
| data-sort-value="303.004" | 5.
| data-sort-value="1730-01-01" |  or earlier
| chorale setting "Wo Gott zum Haus gibt nicht sein Gunst"
| G maj.
| SATB
|
| data-sort-value="III/02 1: 050" | III/2.1: 40
| data-sort-value="after Z 0305; text by Kolross" | after Z 305; text by Kolross
| 
|- style="background: #F6E3CE;"
| data-sort-value="1124.000" | 1124
| data-sort-value="303.005" | 5.
| data-sort-value="1730-01-01" |  or earlier
| chorale setting "Ich ruf zu dir, Herr Jesu Christ"
| E min.
| SATB
|
| data-sort-value="III/02 1: 069" | III/2.1: 51
| after Z 7400; text by Agricola, J.
| 
|- style="background: #F6E3CE;"
| data-sort-value="1125.000" | 1125
| data-sort-value="303.006" | 5.
| data-sort-value="1730-01-01" |  or earlier
| chorale setting "O Gott, du frommer Gott"
| D maj.
| SATB
|
| data-sort-value="III/02 1: 113" | III/2.1: 79
| after Z 5206b; text by Heermann
| 
|-
| data-sort-value="1126.000" | 1126
| data-sort-value="303.007" | 5.
|
| chorale setting "Lobet Gott, unsern Herren"
|
| SATB
|
| data-sort-value="III/02 2: 218" | III/2.2: 218
|
| 
|- id="BWV Chapter 6" style="background: #D8D8D8;"
| data-sort-value="0438.z99" | 6.
| data-sort-value="304.001" colspan="8" | Songs, Arias and Quodlibet (see also: List of songs and arias of Johann Sebastian Bach)
| data-sort-value="0508a" | Up ↑

|- id="BWV Chapter 7" style="background: #D8D8D8;"
| data-sort-value="0524.z99" | 7.
| data-sort-value="311.001" colspan="8" | Works for organ (see also: List of organ compositions by Johann Sebastian Bach)
| data-sort-value="0596a" | Up ↑

|- id="BWV Chapter 10" style="background: #D8D8D8;"
| data-sort-value="1000.z99" | 10.
| data-sort-value="411.001" colspan="8" | Chamber music (see also: List of chamber music works by Johann Sebastian Bach)
| data-sort-value="1178aa" | Up ↑

|- id="BWV Chapter 11" style="background: #D8D8D8;"
| data-sort-value="1040.z99" | 11.
| data-sort-value="424.001" colspan="8" | Works for orchestra (see also: List of orchestral works by Johann Sebastian Bach)
| data-sort-value="1222a" | Up ↑

|- id="BWV Later" style="background: #D8D8D8;"
| data-sort-value="1080.z99" | Later
| data-sort-value="442.010" colspan="8" | Later additions to the main catalogue (above BWV 1128: BWV3)
| data-sort-value="1266a" | Up ↑

|- id="Reconstructions" style="background: #D8D8D8;"
| data-sort-value="A214.ZZZ999998" | R
| data-sort-value="448.153" colspan="8" | Reconstructions (see also Reconstruction of music by Johann Sebastian Bach)
| data-sort-value="1524a" | Up ↑

|- id="BWV deest" style="background: #D8D8D8;"
| data-sort-value="A214.ZZZ999999" | —
| data-sort-value="485.999" colspan="8" |

| data-sort-value="1524b" | Up ↑
|-
| data-sort-value="0655.B00" | 655b
| data-sort-value="500.001" | –
| data-sort-value="1748-12-31" | 1708–1789
| chorale setting "Herr Jesu Christ, dich zu uns wend" (alternative version "a" in BGA)
|
| Organ
| data-sort-value="000.25 2: 159" | 252: 159
|
| data-sort-value="after BWV 0655" | after BWV 655(a); ↔ 655c
| 
|-
| data-sort-value="0655.C00" | 655c
| data-sort-value="500.002" | –
| data-sort-value="1748-12-31" | 1708–1789
| chorale setting "Herr Jesu Christ, dich zu uns wend" (alternative version "b" in BGA)
|
| Organ
| data-sort-value="000.25 2: 160" | 252: 160
|
| data-sort-value="after BWV 0655" | after BWV 655(a); ↔ 655b
| 
|-
| data-sort-value="0813.A00" | 813a
| data-sort-value="500.010" | –
|
| French Suites, No. 2 – Version B (early version): No. 6 Menuet II
| C min.
| Keyboard
| data-sort-value="000.36: 236" | 36: 236
| data-sort-value="V/08: 079" |  V/8: 79
|
| 
|-
| data-sort-value="A215.BCC.008.000" | deest
| data-sort-value="503.080" | BCC 8
| data-sort-value="1736-12-31" | 1723–1750?(JSB?)
| Motet Der Gerechte kömmt um (Wer ist der, so von Edom kömmt/39; funer. motet?)
| E min.
| data-sort-value="SSATB Flx2 Obx2 Str Bc" | SSATB 2Fl 2Ob Str Bc
|
| I/41: 127
| by Kuhnau? (Tristis est...); arr. by Bach?
| 
|-
| data-sort-value="A215.BCD.001.000" | deest
| data-sort-value="504.010" | BCD 1
| data-sort-value="1717-03-28" | 1717-03-28?
| Passion Weimarer Passion
|
| data-sort-value="stbSATB Flx2 Obx2 Str Bc" | ?stbSATB 2Fl 2Ob Str Bc
|
|
| data-sort-value="→ BWV 0023/4" | → BWV 23/4 (and 55/3; 244/29; 245a–c; 283?)
| 
|- style="background: #E3F6CE;"
| data-sort-value="A215.BCD.005.A00" | deest
| data-sort-value="505.051" | BCD 5a
| data-sort-value="1712-12-31" | 1707 (Kei)before 1713(JSB)
| Passion Jesus Christus ist um unsrer Missetat willen verwundet (St Mark Passion pastiche, Weimar version)
|
| SATB 2Vl 2Va Hc
|
| data-sort-value="II/9: 069" | II/9: 69
| Pasticcio (Keiser G.?, Bach)
| 
|- style="background: #E3F6CE;"
| data-sort-value="A215.BCD.005.B00" | deest
| data-sort-value="505.052" | BCD 5b
| 1726-04-19(JSB)
| Passion Jesus Christus ist um unsrer Missetat willen verwundet (St Mark Passion pastiche, 1st Leipzig version)
|
| SATB 2Vl 2Va Org
|
| II/9
| Pasticcio after BC D 5a (Keiser G.?, Bach) adding BWV 500a and 1084)
| 
|-
| data-sort-value="A215.BCD.010.000" | deest
| data-sort-value="505.100" | BCD 10
| data-sort-value="1750-07-01" | 1750?
| Passion Wer ist der, so von Edom kömmt
| D min.
| data-sort-value="satbSSATB Flx2 Obx2 Str Bc" | satbSSATB 2Fl 2Ob Str Bc
|
| data-sort-value="I/41: 095" | I/41: 95
| Pasticcio (Graun, C. H.; Telemann; Bach; ...)
| 
|- style="background: #F6E3CE;"
| data-sort-value="0008.107" | deest(8/6*)
| data-sort-value="507.131" | BC F 131 .1c
| data-sort-value="1735-07-01" | 
| chorale setting "Liebster Gott, wenn werd ich sterben"
| E♭ maj.
| SATB
|
| data-sort-value="III/02 1: 148" | III/2.1: 100
| after Z 6634; text by Neumann
| 
|- style="background: #E3F6CE;"
| data-sort-value="A215.BGA.432.035" |
| data-sort-value="643.535" | BGA
| data-sort-value="1725-07-01" | 1725 (JSB)
| Notebook A. M. Bach (1725) No. 21 Menuet fait par Mons. Böhm
| G maj.
| Keyboard
| data-sort-value="000.43 2: 035" | 432: 35
| data-sort-value="V/04: 082" | V/4: 82
| by Böhm
|
|- id="BNB I/B/48" style="background: #E3F6CE;"
| data-sort-value="A215.BNB.01B.048" |
| data-sort-value="710.248" | BNBI/B/48
| data-sort-value="1738-07-01" | 1738(JSB)
| data-sort-value="Massx6" | 6 Masses without Benedictus and Agnus Dei from 
|
| data-sort-value="SATBx2 Tbnx3 Str Bc" | 2SATB 3Tbn Str Bc
|
|
| by Bassani; copied by Bach (BNB I/B/48), later adding BWV 1081
| 
|- id= "BNB I/C/1" style="background: #E3F6CE;"
| data-sort-value="A215.BNB.01C.001" |
| data-sort-value="710.301" | BNBI/C/1
| data-sort-value="1741-09-15" | 1740–1742 (JSB)
| Magnificat
| C maj.
| data-sort-value="SATB Tbnx4 Tmp Bc" | SATB 4Tbn Tmp Bc
|
|
| by Caldara; → BWV 1082; in DBB 2755/1
| 
|- style="background: #E3F6CE;"
| data-sort-value="A215.BNB.01K.002" | deest
| data-sort-value="711.102" | BNBI/K/2
| data-sort-value="1747-01-01" | before 1719(Han.)1743–1748(JSB)
| Passion Jesus Christus ist um unsrer Missetat willen verwundet (St Mark Passion pastiche, 2nd Leipzig version)
|
| stSATB 2Ob 2Bas 2Vl 2Va Vc Vne Hc
|
| II/9
| Pasticcio after BC D 5b (Keiser G.?, Bach) and HWV 48/9 /23 /41 /44 /47 /52 /55 (Handel)
| 
|- style="background: #E3F6CE;"
| data-sort-value="A215.NBA.209.013" | deest
| data-sort-value="829.013" | NBA
| data-sort-value="1742-07-01" | 1742(JSB)
| Kyrie–Gloria Mass arranged from Missa sine nomine a 6
| E min.
| SSATTB 2Co 4Tro Vne Hc Org
|
| data-sort-value="II/09: 013" | II/9: 13
| by Palestrina after anon. motet Beata Dei genitrix; arr. by Bach
| 
|- id="NBA V-5" style="background: #E3F6CE;"
| data-sort-value="A215.NBA.505.002" |
| data-sort-value="855.002" | NBA
| 1720-01-22
| data-sort-value="Klavierbüchlein für Wilhelm Friedemann Bach No. 0" | Klavierbüchlein WFB, p. 3a: Claves signatae (introduction on clefs)
|
|
| data-sort-value="000.45 1: 213" | 451: 213
| data-sort-value="V/05: 002" | V/5
| 
|
|- style="background: #E3F6CE;"
| data-sort-value="A215.NBA.505.003" |
| data-sort-value="855.003" | NBA
| 1720-01-22
| data-sort-value="Klavierbüchlein für Wilhelm Friedemann Bach No. 00" | Klavierbüchlein WFB, p. 3b: Explication... (introduction on ornaments)
|
|
| data-sort-value="000.45 1: 213" | 451: 213
| data-sort-value="V/05: 003" | V/5
| 
|
|- style="background: #F5F6CE;"
| data-sort-value="A215.NBA.505.040" |
| data-sort-value="855.040" | NBA
| data-sort-value="1720-07-01" | 1720 (WFB)
| data-sort-value="Klavierbüchlein für Wilhelm Friedemann Bach No. 30" | Klavierbüchlein WFB No. 25: Pièce pour le Clavecin
|
| Keyboard
| data-sort-value="000.45 1: 218" | 451: 218
| data-sort-value="V/05: 040" | V/5: 40
| by 
|
|-
| data-sort-value="A215.NBA.505.045" | deest
| data-sort-value="855.045" | NBA
| data-sort-value="1720-07-01" | 1720 (anon)
| data-sort-value="Klavierbüchlein für Wilhelm Friedemann Bach No. 30" | Klavierbüchlein WFB No. 30: Bass sketch
| G min.
|
| data-sort-value="000.45 1: 220" | 451: 220
| data-sort-value="V/05: 045" | V/5: 45
| 
|
|- style="background: #F5F6CE;"
| data-sort-value="A215.NBA.505.087" |
| data-sort-value="855.087" | NBA
| data-sort-value="1720-07-01" | 1720 (WFB)
| data-sort-value="Klavierbüchlein für Wilhelm Friedemann Bach No. 48a-d" | Klavierbüchlein WFB No. 48a–d: Partita
|
| Keyboard
| data-sort-value="000.45 1: 223" | 451: 223
| data-sort-value="V/05: 087" | V/5: 82
| by Stölzel
|
|}

By genre

Cantatas (BWV 1–224)
See #BWV Chapter 1 in the table above

In the 1950 first edition of the BWV the cantatas were largely listed according to their BGA number:
 BWV 1–200: Church cantatas
 BWV 201–216: Secular cantatas
 BWV 217–224: Cantatas with various issues (lost, incomplete, spurious, doubtful)
Additionally Anh. I of the first edition of the BWV started with a list of some 20 lost cantatas, while Anh. III of that edition listed a few cantata (movements) by other composers (Anh. 156–158).

BWV2a added many more lost cantatas (BWV Anh. 190–199 and 209–212) and alternative versions to known works indicating (partially) lost cantatas or cantata versions, e.g. BWV 244a, the music of which was partially preserved in the St Matthew Passion, BWV 244.

Motets (BWV 225–231)
See #BWV Chapter 2 in the table above

There are over a dozen motets attributed to Bach, about half of which are authentic by all accounts:
 BWV 225–230 are the six compositions that have always been considered motets composed by Bach
 BWV 231 was later renumbered to BWV 28/2a, a variant of the second movement of cantata BWV 28
 BWV 118, published as a cantata in the 19th century, was later recategorised as a motet, following Bach's designation on the score.
 BWV Anh. 159–165 are motets with a doubtful or spurious assignation to Bach, the first of which is however most likely composed by Bach.

Liturgical works in Latin (BWV 232–243)
See #BWV Chapter 3 in the table above

Bach's involvement with Latin church music, as composer, arranger or copyist, includes:
 BWV 232–242: Masses and Mass movements (Mass in B minor; Kyrie–Gloria Masses; separate Mass movements)
 BWV 243: Magnificat
 BWV 1081–1083: later additions to the BWV catalogue
 BWV Anh. 24–30, 166–168: doubtful and spurious works
 BNB I/B/48, I/C/1, I/P/2: copies and arrangements

Passions and oratorios (BWV 244–249)
See #BWV Chapter 4 in the table above

Passions and oratorios composed or contributed to by Bach include:
 BWV 244–247: Passions (St Matthew Passion; St John Passion; St Mark Passion; St Luke Passion)
 BWV 248–249: Oratorios (Christmas Oratorio; Easter Oratorio)
 BWV 11: Ascension Oratorio
 BWV 127/1, 500a, 1084, 1088, deest: St Mark Passion (attributed to Keiser), Weimarer Passion, Wer ist der, so von Edom kömmt
 BWV Anh. 169: passion text by Picander (not set by Bach, apart from using some parts of this text in his St Matthew Passion)

Four-part chorales (BWV 250–438)

See #BWV Chapter 5 in the table above

Bach's chorale settings (usually for SATB choir) are included in:
 BWV 250–438: separate chorale settings
 Cantatas (most prominently in the chorale cantatas), motets, passions, oratorios, Second Notebook for Anna Magdalena Bach
 BWV 1089, 1122–1126: later additions to the BWV catalogue
 BWV Anh. 31, 201–204: doubtful and spurious

Songs and arias (BWV 439–524)
See #BWV Chapter 6 in the table above

Songs and (separate) arias by Bach are included in several collections:
 BWV 439–507: Schemellis Gesangbuch
 BWV 508–518: Second Notebook for Anna Magdalena Bach
 BWV 519–523: D-B Mus. ms. Bach P 802, a manuscript by Johann Ludwig Krebs
 BWV Anh. 32–39: Deutsche Übersetzungen und Gedichte (doubtful)
 BWV Anh. 40–41: Singende Muse an der Pleiße (doubtful)

Associated with the Songs and Arias group:
 BWV 524: (Wedding) Quodlibet for four voices (incomplete)
 BWV 1127: "Alles mit Gott und nichts ohn' ihn" (strophic aria rediscovered in 2005)

Works for organ (BWV 525–771)
See #BWV Chapter 7 in the table above

Bach's organ compositions include:
 BWV 525–530: Sonatas
 BWV 531–582: compositions of the type Prelude/Fantasia/Toccata/Adagio/Passacaglia and/or Fugue
 BWV 583–591: various free organ compositions (Trios/Aria/Canzona/Allabreve/Pastorale/Kleines harmonisches Labyrinth )
 BWV 592–597: Concertos (transcriptions)
 BWV 598: Pedal-Exercitium
 BWV 599–764: Chorale preludes (Orgelbüchlein; Schübler Chorales; Great Eighteen Chorale Preludes or Leipzig Chorales; Chorale preludes from Clavier-Übung III; Kirnberger chorale preludes; other chorale preludes)
 BWV 765–768: Chorale partitas
 BWV 769–771: Chorale variations (includes Canonic Variations on "Vom Himmel hoch da komm' ich her")
 BWV 1085–1087, 1121, 1128: various later additions to the BWV catalogue
 BWV 1090–1120: Neumeister Chorales
 BWV Anh. 42–79, 171–178, 200, 206, 208, 213: lost, doubtful and spurious organ pieces

Works for keyboard (BWV 772–994)

See #BWV Chapter 8 in the table above

Bach's works for harpsichord, clavichord and other keyboard instruments include:
 BWV 772–801: Inventions and Sinfonias
 BWV 802–805: Duets from Clavier-Übung III
 BWV 806–845: Suites and suite movements (English Suites; French Suites; Partitas = Clavier-Übung I; Overture in the French style from Clavier-Übung II; etc.)
 BWV 846–893: The Well-Tempered Clavier (book I, book II)
 BWV 894–962: compositions of the type Prelude/Fantasia/Concerto/Toccata and/or Fugue/Fughetta (includes Chromatic Fantasia and Fugue, Six Little Preludes, several parts of the Klavierbüchlein für Wilhelm Friedemann Bach, etc.)
 BWV 963–970: Sonatas and sonata movements
 BWV 971–987: Concertos (includes Italian Concerto from Clavier-Übung II and various concerto transcriptions)
 BWV 988–991: Variations (includes Goldberg Variations = Clavier-Übung IV and Aria variata alla maniera italiana)
 BWV 992–994: Capriccios and Applicatio (includes Capriccio on the departure of a beloved brother)

Works for solo lute (BWV 995–1000)

See #BWV Chapter 9 in the table above

Bach's compositions for lute and/or lute-harpsichord (Lautenwerck) include:
 BWV 995–1000 suites and separate movements for lute and/or lute-harpsichord
 BWV 1006a: transcription of BWV 1006

Chamber music (BWV 1001–1040)

See #BWV Chapter 10 in the table above

Bach wrote chamber music for solo violin, cello or flute, sonatas for harpsichord and an instrumental soloist, and trio sonatas:
 BWV 1001–1006: Sonatas and partitas for solo violin
 BWV 1007–1012: Cello Suites
 BWV 1013: Partita for solo flute
 BWV 1014–1026: works for accompanied violin (sonatas, suite for violin and harpsichord; sonatas, fugue for violin and basso continuo)
 BWV 1027–1029: sonatas for viola da gamba and harpsichord
 BWV 1030–1035: sonatas for accompanied flute (sonatas for flute and harpsichord; sonatas for flute and basso continuo)
 BWV 1036–1040: trio sonatas

Orchestral works (BWV 1041–1071)
See #BWV Chapter 11 in the table above

Bach wrote concertos and orchestral suites:
 BWV 1041–1045: Violin concertos (in A minor, in E major, Double Concerto); Triple Concerto; Concerto movement/Sinfonia fragment
 BWV 1046–1051: Brandenburg Concertos
 BWV 1052–1065: Harpsichord concertos
 BWV 1066–1071: Orchestral suites and Sinfonia (early version of BWV 1046)

Canons (BWV 1072–1078)
See #BWV Chapter 12 in the table above

Separate canons by Bach are listed in the 12th chapter of the BWV:
 BWV 1072–1078: canons
 BWV 1086–1087: later additions

Late contrapuntal works (BWV 1079–1080)
See #BWV Chapter 13 in the table above

The list of late contrapuntal works contains only two items:
 BWV 1079: The Musical Offering
 BWV 1080: The Art of Fugue

20th-century additions to the BWV catalogue and Anhang
Additions as published in BWV2a

Additions to the main catalogue (BWV 1081–1126)
 BWV 1081 – Credo in unum Deum in F major (for choir), included in Chapter 3 in BWV2a
 BWV 1082 – Suscepit Israel by Antonio Caldara (for choir), as copied by Bach; Included in Chapter 3 in BWV2a
 BWV 1083 – Tilge, Höchster, meine Sünden (motet, "parody", i.e., reworked version, of Pergolesi's Stabat Mater), included in Chapter 3 in BWV2a
 BWV 1084 – O hilf, Christe, Gottes Sohn (chorale from Bach's Leipzig versions of the St Mark Passion attributed to Keiser), included in Chapter 5 in BWV2a
 BWV 1085 – O Lamm Gottes, unschuldig (chorale prelude), included in Chapter 7 in BWV2a
 BWV 1086 – Canon Concordia discors, included in Chapter 12 in BWV2a
 BWV 1087 – 14 canons on the First Eight Notes of Goldberg Variations Ground (discovered 1974), included in Chapter 12 in BWV2a
 BWV 1088 – "So heb ich denn mein Auge sehnlich auf" (arioso for bass), No. 20 in Wer ist der, so von Edom kömmt (pasticcio Passion oratorio); Included in Chapter 4 in BWV2a
 BWV 1089 – Da Jesus an dem Kreutze stund (four-part chorale), included in Chapter 5 in BWV2a
 BWV 1090–1120 – 31 chorale preludes for organ from the Neumeister Collection, discovered in 1985 in the archives of the Yale University library; Included in Chapter 7 in BWV2a, except for BWV 1096, attributed to Johann Pachelbel, which was moved to Anh. III (spurious works).
 BWV 1121, previously Anh. 205 – Fantasie in C minor (organ), included in Chapter 7 in BWV2a
 BWV 1122–1126 – five four-part chorales, moved to Chapter 5 in BWV2a

Additions to the Anhang (BWV Anh. 190–213)
BWV Anh. 190–213 were added between the 1950 and 1990s editions of the catalogue
 BWV Anh. 190–197 – Cantatas added to Anh. I (music lost); see also List of Bach cantatas
 BWV Anh. 198 – Abandoned sketch of a cantata opening, renumbered to BWV 149/1a and added to Chapter 1 in BWV2a
 BWV Anh. 199 – Cantata added to Anh. I (music lost); see also List of Bach cantatas
 BWV Anh. 200 – Fragment of a chorale prelude O Traurigkeit, o herzeleid, added to Anh. I (unused sketch for the Orgelbüchlein)
 BWV Anh. 201–204 – Four-part chorales added to Anh. II (doubtful)
 BWV Anh. 205 – Fantasia in C minor, authenticated as BWV 1121 and added to Chapter 7 in BWV2a
 BWV Anh. 206 – Doubtful chorale prelude, added to Anh. II
 BWV Anh. 207 – Doubtful keyboard fugue, added to Anh. II
 BWV Anh. 208 – Spurious organ fugue, added to Anh. III
 BWV Anh. 209–212 – Lost cantatas added to Anh. I; see also List of Bach cantatas
 BWV Anh. 213 – Lost arrangement for organ of an unidentified Telemann concerto, added to Anh. I

21st-century additions to the BWV catalogue (BWV 1127 and higher)
See also #BWV Later in the table above
BWV numbers assigned after the publication of BWV2a:
 BWV 1127: strophic aria "Alles mit Gott und nichts ohn' ihn" (discovered June 2005)
 BWV Anh. 71, renumbered to BWV 1128: chorale fantasia for organ "Wo Gott der Herr nicht bei uns hält" ( was authenticated as a composition by Bach after Wilhelm Rust's 1877 copy was recovered in March 2008)
 BWV 1129 and higher: BWV3 numbers, see BWV#Numbers above BWV 1126

Derivative works

There is not much system in the way works derived from Bach's compositions are listed. The "R" addition to the BWV number is only well-established for the reconstructions included in NBA VII/7 (e.g. solo violin reconstructions of BWV 565 are not usually indicated as BWV 565R, neither is the system used for reconstructed vocal works). For some series of transcriptions and arrangements works catalogues of these transcribers/arrangers may hold sublists with works derived from compositions by Bach.

Reconstructed concertos
See also #Reconstructions in the table above

Each reconstructed concerto is created after the harpsichord concerto for the presumed original instrument. Such reconstructions are commonly referred to as, for example, BWV 1052R (where the R stands for 'reconstructed'). Other reconstructions and completions of for instance BWV 1059 have been indicated as BWV 1059, or BWV 1059a.

Adaptations
Transcriptions and arrangements in the catalogues of works by other composers include:
Ferruccio Busoni Catalogue numbers BV B 20 to B 46 are arrangements of works by Bach, many of which published in the Bach-Busoni Editions.

See also

 List of compositions by Johann Sebastian Bach printed during his lifetime
 List of fugal works by Johann Sebastian Bach

References
For abbreviations used in the references see also Bibliography at 

Bibliography

Further reading
 Basso, Alberto. Frau Musika: La vita e le opere di J. S. Bach. Turin, EDT :
 Vol. 1 (1979): Le origini familiari, l'ambiente luterano, gli anni giovanili, Weimar e Köthen (1685–1723). 
 Vol. 2 (1983): Lipsia e le opere de la maturità (1723–1750).

External links

 
 
 Johann Sebastian Bach: Systematisch-chronologisches Werkverzeichnis at  
 

 
 
Articles containing video clips